Miss Macedonia is a national beauty pageant in North Macedonia.

Titleholders 
Color key

See also 

North Macedonia
Recurring events established in 1996
Beauty pageants in North Macedonia
Macedonian awards
1996 establishments in the Republic of Macedonia